Queenie may refer to:

Arts and entertainment
Queenie (film), a 1921 American silent drama film
Queenie (Melbourne elephant), an elephant at Melbourne Zoo
Queenie (waterskiing elephant)
Queenie, a 1985 novel by Michael Korda
Queenie (miniseries), a 1987 ABC miniseries based on the Korda novel
Queenie, a 2013 children's novel by Jacqueline Wilson
Queenie (novel), a 2019 novel by Candice Carty-Williams
"Queenie", a song by Irving Berlin
"Queenie", a song by Status Quo from the album Thirsty Work

Other uses
Queenie (name), including a list of people, animals and characters with the name
Queenie, the Manx term for a Queen scallop

See also

Queen (disambiguation)
Typhoon Queenie (disambiguation), two typhoons
"Little Queenie", a 1959 song by Chuck Berry
"50ft Queenie", a 1993 song by PJ Harvey
Queenie of Hollywood, a 1931 film
Queenie, Queenie, who's got the ball?, a game